Westmont is a borough in Cambria County, Pennsylvania, United States. It is part of the Johnstown, Pennsylvania Metropolitan Statistical Area. The population was 5,181 at the 2010 census, down from 5,523 at the 2000 census.

Geography
Westmont is located in southwestern Cambria County and is bordered to the east by the city of Johnstown, to the north by the borough of Brownstown, and to the south by the borough of Southmont and the unincorporated community of Elim.

History
Before the Johnstown Flood of 1889, the Yoder Hill area consisted of nothing more than a few farms, accessible by only a few steep, muddy roads. However, since the flood was so devastating to the city and to its major employer, the Cambria Iron Company, the iron company decided to develop the top of the hill as a suburb for its top personnel to live in. The company commissioned the famous landscape architect, Charles Miller, to lay out the grid for the settlement of "Tiptop", later renamed Westmont. Westmont was located on a ridge high above the valley in which Johnstown is located, and thus in a place of safety. As such, it was also above the smoke, noise, and stench of the city, and attracted the well-to-do of the town, eager to escape what (in many cases) their own factories had wrought. An inclined railway, the Johnstown Inclined Plane, was built for easy travel to the city. With the problem of transportation solved, the new settlement began to grow, and it was incorporated as the Borough of Westmont on June 13, 1892. In 1935, the borough bought the inclined railway from Bethlehem Steel.

In 1938 the Johnstown Traction Company began to operate bus service to Westmont via buses that rode up and down the Inclined Plane. At one time there were plans to extend the Southmont streetcar line from its terminus at Diamond Boulevard and Menoher Boulevard along Diamond Boulevard to Luzerne Street, and then along Luzerne Street in the center median to Colgate Avenue. This rail service extension was never constructed, and streetcar service on the Southmont line was discontinued in 1954 when a rock slide along Southmont Boulevard damaged the track and overhead. Following completion of the "Easy Grade" highway of Menoher Boulevard (PA Route 271) from downtown Johnstown through to Westmont, bus service was transferred to this route and service via the Inclined Plane was discontinued.

Because of its upland location, Westmont escaped destruction in the subsequent floods that damaged flood-prone Johnstown.

A Westmont native was the first American soldier to die in the Vietnam War. Captain Harry Griffith Cramer Jr. grew up at 321 Luzerne Street, a house which still stands today.  He graduated from West Point in 1946, earned a Silver Star for valor in Korea, and commanded the first team of US Special Forces advisers to deploy to Vietnam.  He was killed near Nha Trang on October 21, 1957.

The Westmont Historic District was listed on the National Register of Historic Places in 1995.

Westmont today

Westmont continues to be a town of significant attractive, large, old houses. The present population of Westmont is approximately 5,000 residents.

Westmont is currently governed by the "Weak Mayor-Council" form of government. There are seven council members and a mayor who are elected by the voters for four-year staggered terms. The mayor votes only in case of a tie. The borough council determines municipal policy, enacts laws, approves borough officials, etc. Daily operations are supervised by the borough secretary and the public works director.

Westmont has a volunteer fire company and an ambulance service. Police protection is provided by the West Hills Regional Police Department.

Today Westmont, even though considerably larger than that envisioned by the Cambria Iron Company officials, still retains many of the characteristics that attracted residents here in the first place. It is, for the most part, still a quiet, tree-lined community. One can see joggers, walkers and children throughout the community at all times of the day. Borough restrictions against commercial enterprise are still enforced.

Perhaps the town's standout feature is the allée of American elm trees along Luzerne Street, the last cathedral-arched boulevard left in the United States. Today there are 195 elms, the longest continuous stand of American elms in the country, planted along Luzerne Street. Westmont's elm trees are intensively maintained to protect them from Dutch elm disease.

Demographics

As of the census of 2000, there were 5,523 people, 2,238 households, and 1,627 families residing in the borough. The population density was 2,330.0 people per square mile (899.8/km²). There were 2,376 housing units at an average density of 1,002.4 per square mile (387.1/km²). The racial makeup of the borough was 97.59% White, 0.31% African American, 0.09% Native American, 1.29% Asian, 0.05% Pacific Islander, 0.13% from other races, and 0.54% from two or more races. Hispanic or Latino of any race were 0.91% of the population.

There were 2,238 households, out of which 30.7% had children under the age of 18 living with them, 62.1% were married couples living together, 8.4% had a female householder with no husband present, and 27.3% were non-families. 25.6% of all households were made up of individuals, and 13.9% had someone living alone who was 65 years of age or older. The average household size was 2.47 and the average family size was 2.96.

In the borough the population was spread out, with 24.4% under the age of 18, 4.3% from 18 to 24, 23.1% from 25 to 44, 28.2% from 45 to 64, and 20.0% who were 65 years of age or older. The median age was 44 years. For every 100 females there were 89.1 males. For every 100 females age 18 and over, there were 83.9 males.

The median income for a household in the borough was $53,580, and the median income for a family was $64,185. Males had a median income of $47,477 versus $32,111 for females. The per capita income for the borough was $30,868. About 3.1% of families and 3.8% of the population were below the poverty line, including 2.5% of those under age 18 and 1.6% of those age 65 or over.

See also
 Stackhouse Park
 Westmont Hilltop High School

References

External links

 
 "The History of Westmont" at Johnstownpa.com

Populated places established in 1788
Boroughs in Cambria County, Pennsylvania
1792 establishments in Pennsylvania